Lomno may refer to:

 Łomno, Warmian-Masurian Voivodeship, a village in Nidzica County in northern Poland
 Łomno, Świętokrzyskie Voivodeship, a village in the Starachowice County in southeastern Poland
 Lomno, Slovenia, a settlement in the Krško municipality in Slovenia
 Lomná (river), a river of the Czech Republic